Religion in Palestine may refer to:
State of Palestine#Religion
Freedom of religion in the State of Palestine
Palestinian territories#Religion

See also
Palestine (disambiguation)